Icona is a genus of South Pacific comb-footed spiders (family Theridiidae) that was first described by Raymond Robert Forster in 1955.  it contains only two species, both native to the Auckland Islands: I. alba and I. drama.

See also
 List of Theridiidae species

References

Araneomorphae genera
Spiders of New Zealand
Taxa named by Raymond Robert Forster
Theridiidae